Torge Paetow (born 14 August 1995) is a German footballer who plays as a centre-back for SC Verl.

References

External links
 

1995 births
Living people
German footballers
Association football defenders
VfR Aalen players
SC Weiche Flensburg 08 players
SC Verl players
Regionalliga players
3. Liga players
Oberliga (football) players